Dunkeld is a locality in the Maranoa Region, Queensland, Australia, situated 80.7 kilometres (55.1 mi) south of Mitchell and 122.1 kilometres (75.8 mi) south-west of Roma.

Geography 
The Maranoa River flows from north to south through the locality.

History 
The name Dunkeld derives from a pastoral run name given in 1863 by pastoralists Edward Flood and Samuel Deane Gordon, after the village of Dunkeld, Tayside, Scotland.

Dunkeld State School opened on 25 January 1965.

Education 
Dunkeld State School is a government co-educational primary school (P-6) on Mitchell-St George Road. In 2017, the school had an enrolment of 9 students with 1 teacher and 5 non-teaching staff (1 full-time equivalent). There are no secondary schools in Dunkeld with the closest being Mitchell State School (for students up to Year 10) in Mitchell, 80.7 kilometres (50.1 mi) N of Dunkeld and Roma State College (for students in Year 11 and Year 12) in Roma, 122.1 kilometres (75.8 mi) NE of Dunkeld.

References 

Maranoa Region
Localities in Queensland